The Omak-Okanogan County Chronicle is a newspaper serving North-Central Washington's Okanogan County. The weekly newspaper also covers Ferry County and parts of Douglas County. The newspaper's primary readership is on the U.S. Route 97 corridor stretching from Pateros, Wash., north to the U.S.–Canada border. The newspaper produced a joint weekend publication with The Wenatchee World from 2011-2021. The newspaper is owned by J. Louis Mullen. Teresa Myers has served as the publisher and advertising manager since Oct. 1, 2015. Joseph Claypoole serves as managing editor. The newspaper's offices are located at 618 Okoma Drive, Omak.

References

External links

1910 establishments in Washington (state)
Ferry County, Washington
Okanogan County, Washington
Newspapers published in Washington (state)
Newspapers established in 1910
Weekly newspapers published in the United States